Simon Reeve may refer to:
 Simon Reeve (Australian TV presenter) (born 1961), Australian television presenter
 Simon Reeve (British TV presenter) (born 1972), British author and television presenter